Kafanchan (Fantswam: A̠byin Fantswam; Nikyob: Manɡyanɡ) is a town located in the southern part of Kaduna State, Nigeria, which owes much of its development to the  railway development in the area, being situated at a particular junction of the Nigerian Railway Corporation (NRC) station built in 1927, and it sits on the railtrack connecting Port Harcourt, Enugu, Kafanchan, Kuru, Bauchi, and finally Maiduguri.
As of 2007, Kafanchan had an estimated population of 83,092.

Etymology
James (2000) asserted that the indigenous inhabitants of the Kafanchan town and environs, the Fantswam people (who speak a dialect of Tyap), added the prefix "kwa" to all names of peoples and places, hence, the phrase, "kwa Fantswam". However, the Hausa immigrant elements who interacted with them found it more convenient to pronounce the phrase, kwa-Fantswam, as Kafanchan.

The town developed as a result of British colonial commercial activities, i.e. a railway junction town in the early 20th century. This fact brings another claim as to how the name Kafanchan came into existence. It was said that the name originated during the Nigeria railway construction period in the 1920s, when the railtrack crossbars were being laid, the white man would say in Hausa "kafachan", meaning "leg there", i.e. "put your leg there", then a crossbar would be laid after the labourer widens his leg, pushing a leg forward. Hence, the name Kafanchan.  The above account, however, seems to be false, as the name "Kafanchan" was mentioned by A. J. N. Tremearne in his notes published in 1912, over a decade before the railway construction began in the area.

In the words of the Agwam Fantswam I, Musa Didam,
 In addition, he viewed the popularising of the word  as  a work  of the British colonial authorities. The colonial writer Harold D. Gunn was also stated to have rendered the spelling as "Kabanchan" and accordingly he gave names to related groups using their non-native words on pages 80–81 of his book Pagan Peoples of the Central Area of Northern Nigeria, such as Kaje, Kagoro and Kaninkon instead of Bajju, Agworok and Nikyob.

History
In the oral narrative given by the Agwam Fantswam I, reported by a writer for Sun Travels, the original home of the Fantswam (Kafanchan) people was traced to Inkil, a settlement in the eastern part of the Bauchi State, 5 km from the modern city of Bauchi. The people were said to have left Inkil to settle at a riverine settlement called Bunga, and later on at Karge to the south. Having discovered that there was no enough game around Karge, being hunters, they moved across Zalan to the Jos Plateau, settling temporarily at the present abode of the Anaguta and Afizere (Jarawa) peoples, before proceeding through Rahama, Kauru and subsequently settling at Mashan in Atyap Chiefdom. A need birthed their advancement down to Magata, Kacecere, Zali (Malagum) and then to their present abode, Kafanchan, where they discovered enough games and protection from slave raiders, due to the thickly forested environment and thus chose to stay.

A version by Simon Yohanna (in History of the Fantswam People) has it that the Fantswam "by historical evidences and cultural treats" came from the Bauchi area alongside their Atyap kins, probably around the 17th century AD, from Mashan, split, venturing to Zali (Malagum) where a member of the migrants shot an elephant, which ran into the forested eastern fringe of the Gworok hills with available wild bananas natively called , whereat they adopted the name "Fantswam". Being hunters, they pursued it until they met where it fell within the plains. They finally settled there and became the aboriginal inhabitants of the present-day Kafanchan plains.

A wave of migration caused by human and environmental factors such as the Fulani Jihad and slave raids and famine resulted in other kin sub-groups such as the Nikyob (Hausa: Kaninkon), the Bajju and the Atyap ("Mabatado") settling among the Fantswam. In the early years of the Fulani Jihad of the early 1800s, the Fulani ran being annihilated by the Kajuru Hausa chief. Usman Yabo led his people from Kajuru to settle in a place they named Jama'a Dororo meaning "people of Dororo" and founded an emirate amidst the people who gave him and his people the portion of land where they stayed, south of Fantswam territory. After the formation of the Plateau province (1926), in 1933, the British colonial authorities encouraged the migration of the Hausa-Fulani community of about 955 from Jama'a Daroro to Kafanchan town. The new community settled in the area they called "Jama'a Sarari", a Hausa-Arabic phrase meaning "people of the plains". The Jama'a Emirate is a vassal state of the Zaria Emirate.

In addition to the colonial officers and  missionaries who came in the 1900s, the completion of the busy railway line linking the Kaduna station with the Kuru and the Port Harcourt railway stations in 1927, enabled Kafanchan to experience a heavy influx of migrants from all over the country in search for job and trading opportunities, most notably, the Igbo people from Nigeria's southeast, many of whom left before the Nigerian Civil War in 1967, although some later returned. Yorubas mainly from Ibadan, Ogbomosho and Offa in the southwest also came and settled in considerable amounts in the expanding town, some of whom brought with them their handworks and trades. A good number of the Igbos were engine drivers or rail engine mechanics.

M. G. Smith noted that the Fantswam had been regarded by the British colonial government and writers like C. K. Meek as the part of the Agworok (H. Kagoro) under the Jema'a emirate, not until about the late 1950s were they recognised as a distinct political group. Their town served as the site of the British Divisional Headquarters for Jema'a.

After the death of the emir of Jama'a in 1998, there were resentments to the turbaning of his son as the next emir. In 1999, the son of the late emir was unpopularly turbaned, leading to a public uprising in Kafanchan. The Southern Kaduna indigenous people of the area, under the auspices of the Indigenous People of Jema'a (ICJ) responded to the turbaning by filing a suit against the Kaduna State government at the Kafanchan High Court. The Southern Kaduna people clamoured for the scrapping of the emirate system on their soil, as it was an alien institution imposed on them by the British colonialists. A result could not be ascertained until the new democratic regime came into being.

However, in the year 2001, the then-governor of Kaduna State, Ahmed Mohammed Makarfi, created the Fantswam and Nikyob-Nindem chiefdoms amidst over ten others in the Southern Kaduna area, thereby partially ending the 20th century imposition of the Fantswam people and her kins under emirate rule. However, the Jema'an emirate still remains an institution of the Hausa-Fulani inhabitants.

Today, Kafanchan is a melting pot of many Nigerians from parts of southern Kaduna such as the Gwong and the Ham, and other parts of Nigeria.

Geography

Landscape
The town lies within the Southern Guinea Zone, consisting of forests and savannah lands, and is located southwest of the Jos Plateau escarpment on the windward region. The relief consists of two main rivers, Sanga and Ambe, sourced from the plateau. There lie in addition, numerous hills, valleys streams. The undulating lands also provide fertile grounds for agricultural activities. The town has an attitude of 742m.

Climate

Language

Fantswam, otherwise known as "Kafanchan" is a dialect of Tyap, alongside six or seven others: Gworok, Sholyio, Takad, "Mabatado" Tyap, Tyeca̱rak and Tyuku, and also Jju seems to be a dialect of Tyap.

Counting in Fantswam

Common Expressions in Fantswam

One word you are sure to find funny if you visit Fantswam (Kafanchan) and surroundinɡ areas of southern Kaduna is the exclamation, "Kwot!" (What?!).

Culture

Beliefs

Today, majority of the Fantswam are Christians. Nevertheless, from time past before accepting Christianity, the Fantswam people had believed in the existence of an omnipotent and Almighty God they call "Gwam-tazwa," (or Gwaza), translatable to "King of Heaven", as narrated the monarch. The people also worshipped the Abwoi/Aboi, in whose rite of passage all males aged 14 year and above were initiated.

In the Fantswam funeral tradition in the ancient times, the deceased were buried regardless of age or gender, immediately after death occurred, but may be kept for up to three days in the modern day. The demise of the aged is celebrated within a longer period among the Fantswam, however, the corpse of a youth or child by traditions, is interred immediately with a short period of mourning to lessen the grief.

Fantswam traditional institution

The monarch (Agwam Fantswam) as of 2021 is Agwam (Dr.) Josiah Kantiyok, Agwam Fantswam II. A sword, considered of great antiquity serves as the instrument of office or symbol of power of the monarch, given by the "Makatanak" (an electoral college consisting of members of a sub-clan of traditional priests of the Fantswam with a spiritual right to initiate a new monarch) after the king-to-be had been identified. Sun Travels reported palace sources in Zikpak, stating that no member of the Makatanak was permitted to aspire to the throne of the Agwam's, which serves as a check and balance mechanism.

The Fantswam (Kafanchan) chiefdom comprises five ruling houses, namely: Manyii, Takau, Takum, Zibyin (Kajibyin) and Zikpak. There are six District Heads, seven districts and 32 Village Heads.

The Fantswam in the pre-colonial times were said to have fallen under Kauru/Kajuru rule. Under Kauru, there were at least five chiefs, namely: Yabiliyok, Dodo Jinjirim, Kadong Manza, Abwui Duniya and Dari.

Traditional stools
There are three traditional stools present within Kafanchan town, recognised by the state government. These include the Fantswam, Nikyob-Nindem and Hausa-Fulani stools held by:

 A̱gwam (Dr.) Josiah Tagwai Kantiyok (A̱gwam Fantswam II)
 Tum Tanko Tete (Tum Nikyob)
 Alhaji Muhammadu Isa Muhammadu OFR (Emir of Jama'a AKA "Sarkin Hausawa" i.e. "King of the Hausas")
There are also the stools of the Eze Ndi-Igbo of the Igbo people and Oba of Yoruba in Kafanchan.

Infrastructure
The town has several public educational institutions including primary, secondary and tertiary schools, a High court, a Magistrates' court, police stations, multiple commercial bank buildings, a branch station of the Nigerian Television Authority (NTA), a General Hospital (Sir Patrick Ibrahim Yakowa Memorial Hospital). The town also houses the headquarters of a Christian ministry, Throneroom (Trust) Ministry.

Transportation

Railway

Kafanchan's railway station is the headquarters of one of the Nigerian Railway Corporation (NRC) seven national districts and hubs, the North Central District, comprising states such as Benue, Kaduna, Nasarawa and Plateau States, whose rail network links Nigeria's south and north.

The town lies at the middle of a railway line connecting Port Harcourt, Enugu, Kafanchan, Kuru, Bauchi, and finally Maiduguri.

Air
The closest airport to the town is the Yakubu Gowon Airport, Jos.

Roads

Education

The earliest educational institutions in the town include: the Evangelical Church Winning All (ECWA) Gin School, formerly Sudan Interior Mission (SIM) School; and the Roman Catholic Mission (RCM) School, New Saint Peter Claviers.

As of 2007, Kafanchan housed public educational institutions in the state such as: Kaduna State University (KASU), Kafanchan Campus; Kaduna State College of Education (KSCOE), Gidan Waya; Kaduna State College of Nursing and Midwifery; a Federal Science and Technical College; and at least eight primary schools.

Economy

Commerce

The town has two main markets. The old market site located in the heart of the town and the new market, Yakowa Main Market (the proposed Kafanchan New Market), along the Kafanchan-Kagoro road.

Train services 

The economic fortunes of Kafanchan grew as long as the Nigerian railway industry thrived. Its growth came to a decline, however, with the fall out of the railway. According to the town's monarch while recounting the good old days, as narrated by Sun Travels,

Before the rise and even after the fall of the railways, the Fantswam people's major occupation is agriculture, and like the natives of Chori, Kwoi, Nok and other areas in Ham land, the Fantswam also grow high-quality ginger in abundance in addition to beans, guinea-corn, millet, maize, yam, cocoyam, rice and fonio (F. tson, H. acha). Their town served as a collection centre for ginger and other agricultural harvest. Daily Trust accounted that passenger railway traffic across the North-Central District with Kafanchan as administrative headquarters generated about 30 percent of [the country's] railway revenue in the late 1980s.

Hospitality and tourism

Around the town is a waterfall known as Ka̱byek tityong (Hausa: Matsirga, English: River Wonderful) located around Batadon (Madakiya) of Bajju chiefdom and Aduwan District of Fantswam chiefdom, with underdeveloped tourist attraction potentials, although an indigenously owned resort, Fantswam Resort was of late established around the waterfall area in Aduwan IV, Kafanchan.

Kafanchan is home to some hotels such as: Wonderland Unity Hotel, New World Motel, Kasham Hotel, Afili Guest House, Golama Hotel, Leisure Castle and Royal Castle, and others.

Banking
Various bank branches are located in Kafanchan, especially along the Kafanchan-Kagoro Road. Some of these banks include:
 Access Bank: (No. 19 Kagoro Road, Kafanchan).
 Diamond Bank: (Along Kagoro Road, 101241, Kafanchan).
 Ecobank Nigeria, Kafanchan.
 Fidelity Bank Nigeria: (Along Kagoro Road, Kafanchan).
 First Bank of Nigeria plc, Kafanchan Branch: (No. 8 Kagoro Road, PMB 1019, 961102, Kafanchan.
 Keystone Bank Limited: (Plot 11 Kagoro-Kafanchan Road, 800273, Kafanchan).
 Skye Bank, Kafanchan Branch.
 Union Bank of Nigeria, Kafanchan Branch.
 United Bank for Africa PLC: (Along Kagoro Road, Opposite St. Peter's Catholic Church, A̱duwan, Kafanchan).
 Unity Bank plc: (Along Kagoro Road, Adjacent St. Peter's Catholic Church, A̱duwan, Kafanchan).
 Zenith Bank PLC, Kafanchan Branch.

Kafanchan also has some microfinance banks such as:
 MicroCred Microfinance Bank: (A9 Kagoro Road, Kafanchan).

Politics
The main town earlier comprised two wards of the existing 10 in Jema'a Local Government Area (LGA), namely: Kafanchan A and Kafanchan B, each with a District Head. Today, other wards such as Takau, Kadajya (H. Maigizo), Atuku, Nikyob (H. Kaninkon), and Gidan-Waya have fully and partly become part of the town. The other eight wards in the LGA have four District Heads.

Notable people
 
 Joseph Bagobiri (late Bishop of the Catholic Diocese of Kafanchan and of St. Peter's Catholic Church, Kafanchan)
 Biyi Bandele, Nigerian filmmaker and writer
 George Bisan, footballer
 Sunday Chibuike, footballer
 HRH Agwam Musa Didam, Agwam Fantswam I
 Joe El, Nigerian musical artiste
 HRH Agwam (Dr.) Josiah Tagwai Kantiyok, Agwam Fantswam II
 Osita Nebo, clergyman, academic
 Onuora Nzekwu, Nigerian writer, editor
 Emeka Offor, Nigerian entrepreneur
 Emmanuel N. Onwubiko, Nigerian journalist

See also 
 Kafanchan Peace Declaration
 Railway stations in Nigeria
 Southern Kaduna

References

External links

Populated places in Kaduna State
Towns in Nigeria